Falk Hoffmann (born 29 August 1952 in Chemnitz) is a retired diver from East Germany, who won the gold medal in the men's 10 m platform event at the 1980 Summer Olympics in Moscow, Soviet Union. He competed in three consecutive Summer Olympics for his native country, starting in 1972 (Munich). He ended his career in 1982.

See also
 List of members of the International Swimming Hall of Fame

References

 Profile

1952 births
Living people
German male divers
Divers at the 1972 Summer Olympics
Divers at the 1976 Summer Olympics
Divers at the 1980 Summer Olympics
Olympic divers of East Germany
Olympic gold medalists for East Germany
Sportspeople from Chemnitz
Olympic medalists in diving
Medalists at the 1980 Summer Olympics
World Aquatics Championships medalists in diving
20th-century German people